There have been many comic book adaptations of the monster story created by Mary Shelley in her 1818 novel Frankenstein; or, The Modern Prometheus. Writer-artist Dick Briefer presented two loose adaptations of the story in publisher Prize Comics' successive series Prize Comics and Frankenstein from 1940 to 1954. The first version represents what comics historians call American comic books' first ongoing horror feature.

Publication history

Comics' first horror feature
In Prize Comics #7 (cover-dated Dec. 1940), writer-artist Dick Briefer (using the pseudonym "Frank N. Stein" in the latter role) introduced the eight-page feature "New Adventures of Frankenstein", an updated version of 19th-century novelist Mary Shelley's much-adapted Frankenstein monster. Considered by comics historians to be "America's first ongoing comic book series to fall squarely within the horror genre", the feature, set in New York City circa 1930, starred a guttural, rampaging creature actually dubbed "Frankenstein" (unlike Shelley's nameless original monster).

In Prize Comics #11 (June 1941), Briefer dropped the "Frank N. Stein" pen name of the previous three stories and introduced the doctor's adopted son Denny "Bulldog" Dunsan as Frankenstein's ongoing antagonist. Prize Comics #24 (Oct. 1942) pitted the monster against Bulldog and publisher Prize Comics' superheroes the Black Owl, the Green Lama, and Dr. Frost; the non-superpowered teens Yank and Doodle ("America's Fighting Twins"); and the namesake characters from the humor feature "General and the Corporal". In some stories, the monster also teamed up with two other occult menaces, the Witch and the Mummy.

As with many comics characters of the time, the monster found himself in the European theater of World War II fighting Nazis. In 1942, scientist Dr. Ullrich offers a bride for Frankenstein, in exchange for the monster resolving to aid humans instead of fighting them, but an angry mob burns down the lab, killing both Ullrich and the bride.

Horror to humor
Prize Comics #33 (Aug 1943) brought an abrupt change to the strip. Another scientist, Professor Carroll, performs another experiment that makes Frankenstein look and act more human. A caption explains, "Frankenstein has left behind him a trail of wrecks, disaster, tragedy and murder — but, as we said, he has left it behind him, for thanks to the miraculous work of a great scientist, Frankenstein is a changed person! With a new suit of clothes, a haircut and a facial, he goes out to become a part of human society!" The humanized monster spends a few issues helping with national defense, and then enrolls in grade school.

The character shifted back to horror for a brief period in 1944, beginning with February's Prize Comics #39. The monster was brainwashed by the Nazis to destroy the resistance in occupied territory. The character managed to break free of his conditioning and destroy the Germans' hypnosis machine, but then rampaged through Europe for a while with a female vampire, Zora, and a male zombie, Rollo. After a while, the three characters moved to New York City, and opened a hotel for monsters.

Eight-page Frankenstein stories by Briefer appeared in every issue of Prize Comics from #7-68 a.k.a. vol. 7, #1 (Dec. 1940 - March 1948), with the exception of issues #10 and #55.

Solo comic
Briefer's better-known version of the Frankenstein monster, however, developed upon the monster's return from the war. The character was so popular at that point that they gave him his own series, with Frankenstein #1 (1945).

Like many returning veterans, Frankenstein settled into small-town life, becoming a genial neighbor who "began having delightful adventures with Dracula, the Wolfman and other horrific creatures. The only two times he was featured on the Prize Comics cover (both in 1947), he was referred to as 'The Merry Monster'". Briefer, with his trademark "loose and smooth ink and brush skills" began telling stories that would "straddle some amorphous line between pure children's humor and adventure and an adult sensibility about the world".

In his book Art Out of Time: Unknown Comics Visionaries 1900-1969, author Dan Nadel described Briefer as

Briefer's humorous Frankenstein ran through Prize Comics #68 (March 1948), and his humorous Frankenstein ran through issue #17 (Feb. 1949). Three years later, Briefer (1915–1980) revived the series with his original, horrific Frankenstein from #18-33 (March 1952 - Nov. 1954).

Following the cancellation of Frankenstein during an era that put much pressure on horror comics and other violent comic books, leading to the creation of the Comics Code, Briefer left the comic industry for commercial advertising art.

Reprint collections
 Briefer, Dick. The Monster of Frankenstein (Idea Men Productions, 2006) , 
 Briefer, Dick. Dick Briefer's Frankenstein (Library of Horror Comics' Masters, IDW/Yoe Books, 2010)

See also
 Frankenstein (comics)

References

External links

Frankenstein #32 (vol. 5, #4 per indicia): "The Battle of the Monsters" and "The Beautiful Dead" (reprinted stories)

American comics
American comics characters
Male characters in comics
1940 comics debuts
Comics characters introduced in 1940
1954 comics endings
Humor comics
Horror comics
Comics based on Frankenstein
Fictional undead